John Corbett (born 1961) is an American actor and country music singer.

John Corbett may also refer to:
John Corbett (album), singer John Corbett's self-titled debut album
John Corbett (chemist) (1926–2013), American scientist
John Corbett (coach) (1869–1947), American football player and coach
John Corbett (cricketer) (1883–1944), English cricketer
John Corbett (industrialist) (1817–1901), English industrialist and founder of the Chateau Impney
John Corbett (politician) (born 1962), American politician
John Corbett (Royal Navy officer) (1822–1893), British admiral
John Corbett (rugby union) (1877–1945), New Zealand rugby union player
John Corbett (writer) (born 1963), American writer and producer
John Corbett, 4th Baron Rowallan (born 1947), British peer
John Rooke Corbett (1876–1949), founder-member of The Rucksack Club and their Convener of Rambles

See also
Jonathan Corbett (21st century), British food television presenter
James John Corbett (1866–1933), American boxer
John Corbet (disambiguation)